The DRG Class 99.19 engines were metre gauge, ten-coupled, superheated, steam locomotives that were employed in the southwestern German state of Württemberg from 1927.

In fact this class was to have been procured by the Royal Württemberg State Railways (Königlich Württembergische Staats-Eisenbahnen) as the Class Ts 5, however the intervention of the First World War and the serious economic situation that followed put paid to that.

In 1927 the Deutsche Reichsbahn-Gesellschaft ordered the construction of four of these locomotives from the Maschinenfabrik Esslingen. They were based on a Saxon VI K prototype that already ran on Württemberg's 750mm routes and replaced some ancient Klose locomotives that worked the metre gauge route between Altensteig and Nagold. They were given operating numbers 99 191 - 99 194.

To negotiate the tight curves the first, third and fifth axles were given side play.

Engine number 99 191 was redeployed on 1 April 1944 to work the line between Eisfeld and Schönbrunn. In 1955 it was used in Gera. In the 1970s there was a plan to sell it to a museum railway, but the sale did not come to fruition and the engine was scrapped.

Locomotive number 99 192 was retired on 5 May 1959. Number 99 193 was retired on 30 November 1967 and was transferred into the ownership of EUROVAPOR, where it is used on the Blonay-Chamby museum railway in Switzerland. It was still there in 2007. There are various accounts of the whereabouts of 99 194. It probably ended up in Yugoslavia after the Second World War and was in service there until the late 1960s with the Yugoslav Railways (JŽ).

The engines could hold 2.5 tonnes of coal and 4.66 m2 of water.

See also 
 Deutsche Reichsbahn
 List of DRG locomotives and railbuses

References 

99.019
0-10-0T locomotives
99.19
Railway locomotives introduced in 1927
Metre gauge steam locomotives
E h2t locomotives
Freight locomotives